Ralph Leonhardt (born October 14, 1967) is a former East German/German nordic combined skier who competed during the late 1980s and early 1990s. He won a bronze medal in the 3 x 10 km team event at the 1989 FIS Nordic World Ski Championships in Lahti.

Leonhardt's best individual finish was 2nd in Austria in 1992.

External links

1967 births
German male Nordic combined skiers
Living people
FIS Nordic World Ski Championships medalists in Nordic combined